An election to Preseli District Council was held in May 1979.   It was preceded by the 1976 election and followed by the 1983 election. On the same day there was a UK General Election and elections to the other local authorities and community councils in Wales.

Results

Ambleston (one seat)

Burton (one seat)

Boulston (one seat)

Camrose (one seat)

Clydey and Llanfyrnach (one seat)

Eglwyswrw (one seat)

Fishguard (three seats)

Freystrop and Llangwm (one seat)

Goodwick(one seat)

Haverfordwest Ward One (three seats)

Haverfordwest Ward Two (three seats)

Henry's Moat (one seat)

Johnston (one seat)

Kilgerran and Manordeifi (one seat)

Llanwnda (one seat)

Maenclochog (one seat)

Mathry (one seat)

Milford Haven, Central and East (three seats)

Milford Haven, Hakin and Hubberston (three seats)

Milford Haven, North and West (three seats)

Nevern (one seat)

Newport (one seat)

Neyland (two seats)

St David's (one seat)

St Dogmaels (one seat)

St Ishmaels (one seat)

St Thomas and Haroldson St Issels (one seat)

Steynton (one seat)

Walwyns Castle (one seat)

Whitchurch (one seat)

Wiston (one seat)

References

Preseli Pembrokeshire District Council elections
Preseli District Council election